In mathematical physics, the concept of quantum spacetime is a generalization of the usual concept of spacetime in which some variables that ordinarily commute are assumed not to commute and form a different Lie algebra.  The choice of that algebra still varies from theory to theory.
As a result of this change some variables that are usually continuous may become discrete.
Often only such discrete variables are called "quantized"; usage varies.

The idea of quantum spacetime was proposed in the early days of quantum theory by Heisenberg and Ivanenko as a way to eliminate infinities from quantum field theory.
The germ of the idea passed from Heisenberg to Rudolf Peierls, who noted that electrons in a magnetic field can be regarded as moving in a quantum spacetime, and to Robert Oppenheimer, who carried it to Hartland Snyder,
who published the first concrete example.
Snyder's Lie algebra was made simple by C. N. Yang in the same year.

Overview
Physical spacetime is a quantum spacetime when in quantum mechanics position and momentum variables  are already noncommutative, obey the Heisenberg uncertainty principle, and are continuous.
Because of the Heisenberg uncertainty relations, greater energy is needed to probe smaller distances.
Ultimately, according to gravity theory, the probing particles form black holes that destroy what was to be measured. The process cannot be repeated, so it cannot be counted as a measurement.
This limited measurability led many to expect that our usual picture of continuous commutative spacetime breaks down at Planck scale distances, if not sooner.

Again, physical spacetime is expected to be quantum because physical coordinates are already slightly noncommutative.
The astronomical coordinates of a star are modified by gravitational fields between us and the star, as in the deflection of light by the sun, one of the classic tests of general relativity.
Therefore, the coordinates actually depend on gravitational field variables.
According to quantum theories of gravity these field variables do not commute;
therefore coordinates that depend on them likely do not commute.

Both arguments are based on pure gravity and quantum theory, and they limit the measurement of time
by the only time constant in pure quantum gravity, the Planck time.
Our instruments, however, are not purely gravitational but are made of particles. They may set a more severe, larger, limit than the Planck time.

Criteria
Quantum spacetimes are often described mathematically using the noncommutative geometry of Connes,
quantum geometry, or quantum groups.

Any noncommutative algebra with at least four generators could be interpreted as a quantum spacetime, but
the following desiderata have been suggested:
 Local Lorentz group and Poincaré group symmetries should be retained, possibly in a generalised form. Their generalisation often takes the form of a quantum group acting on the quantum spacetime algebra.
 The  algebra might plausibly arise in an effective description of quantum gravity effects in some regime of that theory.
This would permit wave equations for particles and fields and facilitate predictions for experimental deviations from classical spacetime physics that can then be tested experimentally.
 The Lie algebra should be semisimple. This makes it easier to formulate a finite theory.

Models
Several models were found in the 1990s more or less meeting most of the above criteria.

Bicrossproduct model spacetime 
The bicrossproduct model spacetime was introduced by Shahn Majid and Henri Ruegg and has Lie algebra relations

 

for the spatial variables  and the time variable . Here  has dimensions of time and is therefore expected to be something like the Planck time. The Poincaré group here is  correspondingly deformed, now to a certain bicrossproduct quantum group  with the following characteristic features.

The momentum generators  commute among themselves but addition of momenta, reflected in the quantum group structure, is deformed (momentum space becomes a non-abelian group). Meanwhile, the Lorentz group generators enjoy their usual relations among themselves but act non-linearly on the momentum space. The  on-shell region describing particles in the upper center of the image would normally be hyperboloids but these are now 'squashed' into the cylinder

 

in simplified units.  The upshot is that Lorentz-boosting a momentum will never increase it above the Planck momentum. The existence of a highest momentum scale or lowest distance scale fits the physical picture. This squashing comes from the non-linearity of the Lorentz boost and is an endemic feature of bicrossproduct quantum groups known since their introduction in 1988. Some physicists dub the bicrossproduct model doubly special relativity, since it sets an upper limit to both speed and momentum.

Another consequence of the squashing is that the propagation of particles is deformed, even of light, leading to a variable speed of light. This prediction requires the particular  to be the physical energy and spatial momentum (as opposed to some other function of them). Arguments for this identification were provided in 1999 by Giovanni Amelino-Camelia and Majid through a study of plane waves for a quantum differential calculus in the model. They take the form

 

in other words a form which is sufficiently close to classical that one might plausibly believe the interpretation. At the moment such wave analysis represents the best hope to obtain physically testable predictions from the model.

Prior to this work there were a number of unsupported claims to make predictions from the model based solely on the form of the Poincaré quantum group. There were also claims based on an earlier -Poincaré quantum group introduced by Jurek  Lukierski and co-workers which should be viewed as an important precursor to the bicrossproduct one, albeit without the actual quantum spacetime and with different proposed generators for which the above picture does not apply.

q-Deformed spacetime 
This model was introduced independently by a team working under Julius Wess in 1990 and by Shahn Majid and coworkers in a series of papers on braided matrices starting a year later. The  point of view in the second approach is that usual Minkowski spacetime has a nice description via Pauli matrices as the space of 2 x 2 hermitian matrices.

 

These relations say that the generators commute as  thereby recovering usual Minkowski space. One can work with more familiar variables  as linear combinations of these. In particular, time

 

is given by a natural braided trace of the matrix and commutes with the other generators (so this model has a very different flavour from the bicrossproduct one).  The braided-matrix picture also leads naturally to a quantity

 

which as  returns us the usual Minkowski distance (this translates to a metric in the quantum differential geometry). That is, there are indications that this model relates to quantum gravity with non-zero cosmological constant, the choice of  depending on whether this is positive or negative. We have described the mathematically better understood but perhaps less physically justified positive case here.

A full understanding of this model requires (and was concurrent with the development of) a full theory of 'braided linear algebra' for such spaces. The momentum space for the theory is another copy of the same algebra and there is a certain 'braided addition' of momentum on it expressed as the structure of a  braided Hopf algebra or quantum group in a certain braided monoidal category). This theory by 1993 had provided the corresponding  -deformed Poincaré group as generated by such translations and -Lorentz transformations, completing the interpretation as a quantum spacetime.

In the process it was discovered that the Poincaré group not only had to be deformed but had to be extended to include dilations of the quantum spacetime. For such a theory to be exact we would need all particles in the theory to be massless, which is consistent with experiment as masses of elementary particles are indeed vanishingly small compared to the Planck mass.  If current thinking in cosmology is correct then this model is more appropriate, but it is significantly  more complicated and for this reason its physical predictions have yet to be worked out.

Fuzzy or spin model spacetime 
This refers in modern usage to the angular momentum algebra

 

familiar from quantum mechanics but interpreted in this context as coordinates of a quantum space or spacetime. These relations were proposed by Roger Penrose in his earliest spin network theory of space. It is a toy model of quantum gravity in 3 spacetime dimensions (not the physical 4) with a Euclidean (not the physical Minkowskian) signature. It was again proposed in this context by Gerardus 't Hooft. A further development including a quantum differential calculus and an action of a certain 'quantum double' quantum group as deformed Euclidean group of motions was given by Majid and E. Batista

A striking feature of the noncommutative geometry here is that the smallest covariant quantum differential calculus has one dimension higher than expected, namely 4, suggesting that  the above can also be viewed as the spatial part of a 4-dimensional quantum spacetime. The model should not be confused with fuzzy spheres which are finite-dimensional matrix algebras which one can think of as spheres in the spin model spacetime of fixed radius.

Heisenberg model spacetimes 
The quantum spacetime of Hartland Snyder proposes that

 

where the  generate the Lorentz group. This quantum spacetime and that of C. N. Yang entail a radical unification of spacetime, energy-momentum, and angular momentum.

The idea was revived in a modern context by Sergio Doplicher, Klaus Fredenhagen and John Roberts in 1995
The Lorentz symmetry is arranged so as to transform the indices as usual and without being deformed.

In even dimensions , any nondegenerate such theta can be transformed to a normal form in which this really is just the Heisenberg algebra but the difference that the variables are being proposed as those of spacetime. This proposal was for a time quite popular because of its familiar form of relations and because it has been argued  that it emerges from the theory of open strings landing on D-branes, see noncommutative quantum field theory and Moyal plane. However, this D-brane lives in some of the higher spacetime dimensions in the theory and hence it is not our physical spacetime that string theory suggests to be effectively quantum in this way. You also have to subscribe to D-branes as an approach to quantum gravity in the first place. Even when posited as quantum spacetime it is hard to obtain physical predictions and one reason for this is that if  is a tensor then by dimensional analysis it should have dimensions of length, and if this length is speculated to be the Planck length then the effects would be even harder to ever detect than for other models.

Noncommutative extensions to spacetime 
Although not quantum spacetime in the sense above, another use of noncommutative geometry is to tack on 'noncommutative extra dimensions' at each point of ordinary  spacetime. Instead of invisible curled up extra dimensions as in string theory, Alain Connes and coworkers have argued that the coordinate algebra of this extra part should be replaced by a finite-dimensional noncommutative algebra.  For a certain reasonable choice of this algebra, its representation and extended Dirac operator, one is able to recover the Standard Model of elementary particles. In this point of view the different kinds of matter particles are manifestations of geometry in these extra noncommutative directions. Connes's first works here date from 1989 but has been developed considerably since then. Such an approach can theoretically be combined with quantum spacetime as above.

See also 
 Quantum group
 Quantum geometry
 Noncommutative geometry
 Quantum gravity
 Anabelian topology

References

Further reading 
 
 
 
 
 R. P. Grimaldi, Discrete and Combinatorial Mathematics: An Applied Introduction, 4th Ed. Addison-Wesley 1999.
 J. Matousek, J. Nesetril, Invitation to Discrete Mathematics. Oxford University Press 1998.
 Taylor E. F., John A. Wheeler, Spacetime Physics, publisher W. H. Freeman, 1963.

External links 
 Plus Magazine article on quantum geometry by Marianne Freiberger
 

Mathematical physics